Chi Darki (also Romanized as Chī Darkī; also known as Chedergi) is a village in Piveshk Rural District, Lirdaf District, Jask County, Hormozgan Province, Iran. At the 2006 census, its population was 38, in 10 families.

References 

Populated places in Jask County